Van Volxem is a Belgian surname. Notable people with the surname include:

Gaston Van Volxem (1893–?), Belgian ice hockey player
Guillaume Van Volxem (1791–1868), Belgian lawyer and politician

Surnames of Dutch origin
Surnames of Belgian origin